Jesse E. Overstreet (December 14, 1859 – May 27, 1910) was an American lawyer and politician who served seven terms as a U.S. Representative from Indiana from 1895 to 1909.  In 1900, Overstreet introduced the legislation that was ultimately passed as the Gold Standard Act.

Biography 
Born in Franklin, Indiana, Overstreet attended the schools of his native city.
He was graduated from the Franklin High School in 1877 and from Franklin College in 1882.
He studied law.
He was admitted to the bar in 1886 and commenced practice in Franklin.
He served as member of the Republican State central committee of Indiana in 1892.

Congress 
Overstreet was elected as a Republican to the Fifty-fourth and to the six succeeding Congresses (March 4, 1895 - March 3, 1909).
He served as chairman of the Committee on Expenditures in the Department of Justice (Fifty-sixth and Fifty-seventh Congresses), Committee on the Post Office and Post Roads (Fifty-eighth through Sixtieth Congresses).
He was an unsuccessful candidate for reelection in 1908 to the Sixty-first Congress.

Later career and death 
He resumed the practice of his profession.

He died in Indianapolis, Indiana, May 27, 1910.
He was interred in the Columbus City Cemetery, Columbus, Indiana.

References

1859 births
1910 deaths
Franklin College (Indiana) alumni
People from Franklin, Indiana
19th-century American politicians
Republican Party members of the United States House of Representatives from Indiana